Alexander Gruszynski (born June 19, 1950) is a Polish-American cinematographer, actor and film director.  He attended the National Film School of Denmark, Copenhagen.

In 1985 Gruszynski moved to America and is now a member of the American Society of Cinematographers.

Filmography

Film

Television
TV moviesTV series'''

References

External links
Alexander Gruszynski at the Internet Encyclopedia of Cinematographers

1950 births
Film people from Warsaw
Polish cinematographers
Living people
Polish male film actors
Polish film directors
Bodil Honorary Award recipients